William Frederick Harnden (23 August 1812 – 14 January 1845) was the founder of Harnden and Company, one of the first independent express companies in the United States.
Harnden started his career with the railroads by selling tickets at the Boston and Providence Railroad depot on Washington Street in Worcester, Massachusetts.  He soon started consigning express shipments by rail between Boston and Providence, Rhode Island.  With his first consignment on March 4, 1839, he became the first person to send an express shipment by rail.  Following the success of express shipping on this route, he expanded his business to ship express to New York City and Philadelphia.

He founded Harnden and Company, which specialized in trans-Atlantic service with offices in London, Liverpool, Paris, Le Havre and several other major European cities.  In 1854 Harnden and Company merged with three other express companies to form Adams Express, led by Alvin Adams.

Notes

References
 The Living Age, The Late William F. Harnden.  Retrieved March 30, 2005.
 Rivanna Chapter, National Railway Historical Society (2005), This Month in Railroad History: March. Retrieved March 30, 2005.
 Stimmell, Gordon, U.S. Carriers, Locals, & Independent Mails.  Retrieved March 30, 2005.
 

1812 births
1845 deaths
American people in rail transportation
19th-century American businesspeople